Alberto de Meneses Rodrigues (1904–1971) was a Goan writer.

Works
 Arroios: poesias (Goa: Tipografia Sadananda, 1954), poems
 Caminhos de luz: novelas (Bastora, Goa: Tipografia Rangel, 1958), three novellas 
 A água do oásis: poemas (Bastora: Tipografia Rangel, 1964), poems
 Flor campestre: contos e novelas (Goa: Tipografia Rangel, 1968), a collection of short stories and novellas 
 'Insónia', 'Estiagem', 'Uma lágrima caiu sobre a fulva areia', in A literatura indo-portuguesa: antologia, ed. by Vimala Devi and Manuel de Seabra (Lisboa: Junta de Investigações do Ultramar, 1971), II, 361-64

1904 births
1971 deaths
20th-century Indian poets
Poets from Goa
Indian male novelists
Portuguese-language writers
20th-century Indian novelists
Novelists from Goa
20th-century Indian male writers
Date of birth missing
Date of death missing